Hwang Hun-Hee  (6 April 1987) is a South Korean football forward who last played for Chungju Hummel.

Career 
He was participant of the 2009 Summer Universiade in Belgrade. In 2009, Hun-Hee started his professional football career in Ukrainian Premier League side FC Metalurh Zaporizhya. He made his debut for Metalurh Zaporizhya on 9 August 2009 against Vorskla Poltava after coming on as a substitute at the 63 minute.

Hwang was without a club for about a one-year after Zaporizhya cut him in January 2010. He was the second pick by Daejeon Citizen in the 2011 K-League draft.

References

External links 
FC Metalurh Zaporizhya Official Site Profile

 

1987 births
Living people
Association football forwards
South Korean footballers
South Korean expatriate footballers
South Korean expatriate sportspeople in Ukraine
FC Metalurh Zaporizhzhia players
Daejeon Hana Citizen FC players
Chungju Hummel FC players
Ukrainian Premier League players
K League 1 players
Korea National League players
K League 2 players
K3 League players
Expatriate footballers in Ukraine
Pocheon Citizen FC players